Samuel Mitchell may refer to:

Samuel Mitchell (Western Australian politician) (1838–1912), Western Australian politician
Samuel Mitchell (VC) (1841–1894), Victoria Cross recipient
Samuel Alfred Mitchell (1874–1960), Canadian astronomer
Samuel Augustus Mitchell (1790–1868), American geographer
Samuel Brown Wylie Mitchell (1828–1879), founder of Phi Kappa Sigma fraternity
Samuel James Mitchell (1852–1926), South Australian politician and judge
Samuel N. Mitchell (1846–1905), American lyricist

See also
Samuel L. Mitchill (1764–1831), American doctor and politician
Sam Mitchell (disambiguation)